Farmington is the name of some places in the U.S. state of Wisconsin:
Farmington, Jefferson County, Wisconsin, a town
Farmington, La Crosse County, Wisconsin, a town
Farmington, Polk County, Wisconsin, a town
East Farmington, Wisconsin, unincorporated community located in the town of Farmington, Polk County
Farmington, Washington County, Wisconsin, a town
Farmington, Waupaca County, Wisconsin, a town
Farmington (community), Wisconsin, an unincorporated community

See also 
Farmington (disambiguation)